The 2000 United States Senate election in Tennessee took place on November 7, 2000, as part of the general election including the 2000 U.S. presidential election, elections to the House of Representatives and various state and local elections. Incumbent Republican U.S. Senator Bill Frist won re-election to a second term, vastly improving on his performance from 1994.

Democratic primary 
The Democratic primary was held August 3, 2000. In a field of five candidates, Jeff Clark, a professor at Middle Tennessee State University, edged out John Jay Hooker to win the nomination.

Republican primary 
Bill Frist, incumbent U.S. Senator, was unopposed in the Republican primary. He received 186,882 votes.

General election

See also 
 2000 United States Senate elections

References 
General

Specific
 

Tennessee
2000
2000 Tennessee elections